
The Dutch Corps Monument is a provincial heritage site in Kliprivier in the KwaZulu-Natal district of South Africa. It was designed by Gerard Moerdijk. The monument was vandalized in 2014.

In 1982, it was described in the Government Gazette as

Gallery

See also
 Herman Coster a Dutch lawyer and State Attorney of the Zuid-Afrikaansche Republiek commemorated on the monument.

References

External links 

 South African Heritage Resource Agency database

Buildings and structures in KwaZulu-Natal
Monuments and memorials in South Africa
Second Boer War memorials
Vandalized works of art
Netherlands–South Africa relations